Chamaesphecia maurusia is a moth of the family Sesiidae. It is found in Spain and Portugal and in Sicily, as well as in Algeria and Morocco.

The larvae feed on Marrubium species.

References

Moths described in 1912
Sesiidae
Moths of Europe
Moths of Africa